Zəhmətkənd (also, Musabekov and Zakhmetkend) is a village and municipality in the Gadabay Rayon of Azerbaijan.  It has a population of 1,954.  The municipality consists of the villages of Zəhmətkənd and Qarabulaq.

References 

Populated places in Gadabay District